Upsilon Phi Delta is the national academic honor society for students in healthcare administration in the United States. The organization was formed in 1965 to further the profession of health administration and the professional competence and dedication of its members. It is administered by the Association of University Programs in Health Administration.

The name of the society is derived from the Greek words for "health," "care," and "administration." Its official colors are crimson red and cobalt blue and its official flower is the rose.

See also
Master of Health Administration
Bachelor of Science in Public Health

External links
Official website

Honor societies
Student organizations established in 1965